Andrea Micheletti (born 9 April 1981) is an Italian darts player who plays in Professional Darts Corporation events.

In 2019, he made his television debut in the 2019 PDC World Cup of Darts, partnering Stefano Tomassetti but they lost in the first round to the team of Canada despite averaging 95.53 in the doubles match.

References

External links

1981 births
Living people
Italian darts players
Professional Darts Corporation associate players
PDC World Cup of Darts Italian team